Mascara District is a district of Mascara Province, Algeria.

Municipalities
The district is further divided into 1 municipality:
Mascara

Districts of Mascara Province